is a Japanese writer and actress.

Early life
Ayako Fujitani was born in Osaka, Japan. She is the daughter of Steven Seagal by his first wife, aikido master Miyako Fujitani. As a teenager, she also resided in Los Angeles.

Career

Acting
Fujitani made her screen debut in Gamera: Guardian of the Universe, after a chance meeting at a film festival with director Shusuke Kaneko. She worked again with him on an episode of Ultraman Max he directed. Other film roles include parts in Sansa, the "Interior Design" segment of Tokyo!, and Man from Reno.

Writing
Fujitani wrote for the Japanese magazine Roadshow. She had published her coupled novellas Touhimu (Flee-Dream) and Yakeinu (Burnt Dog). Along with writer and director Hideaki Anno, Fujitani co-adapted her novella Touhimu (Flee-Dream) into the film Shiki-Jitsu in 2000. It was the first non-animated feature released by Studio Ghibli under the Studio Kajino label. She stars in the title role.

Fujitani has written both fiction and non-fiction, contributing essays and short stories to various national publications.

In 2014, Fujitani co-wrote an Ermenegildo Zegna-commissioned short film with Park Chan-wook, Chung Chung-hoon and Michael Werwie that Park also directed, and that Clint Mansell scored entitled A Rose Reborn starring Jack Huston and Daniel Wu.

Other pursuits
In 2006, she directed a short drama for TV Tokyo's Drama Factory program.

Personal life
She has been married to screenwriter Javier Gullón since 2016. The couple have two daughters.

References

External links

Agency profile

Profile at JMDb 
Ken's Force review of Shikijitsu
KFC Cinema review of Gamera

1979 births
Living people
Actresses from Osaka
Japanese film actresses
Japanese television actresses 
Japanese female models 
Japanese people of American descent
Japanese people of German descent
Japanese people of English descent
Japanese people of Mongolian descent
Japanese people of Russian-Jewish descent
Japanese writers
Models from Osaka Prefecture
Steven Seagal
20th-century Japanese actresses
21st-century Japanese actresses